The 1939–40 Sheffield Shield season was the 44th season of the Sheffield Shield, the domestic first-class cricket competition of Australia. New South Wales won the championship.

During the match between Queensland and Victoria in January 1940, Victorian openers Ian Lee and Ben Barnett became the first openers to achieve partnerships of 150 or more in both innings of a Shield match, when they put on 152 (Lee 90, Barnett 92) and 169 (Lee 93, Barnett 104*).

Table

Statistics

Most Runs
Don Bradman 1062

Most Wickets
Bill O'Reilly 52

References

Sheffield Shield
Sheffield Shield
Sheffield Shield seasons